Piz Chavalatsch (also known as Monte Cavallaccio) (2,763 m) is a mountain in the Ortler Range of the Alps of eastern Switzerland and northern Italy. It forms the border between the Swiss canton of Graubünden and the Italian Province of Bolzano.

The easternmost point of Switzerland is located at Piz Chavalatsch at c.  (Swiss Grid: 833841/166938).

References

External links

 Piz Chavalatsch on Hikr
 Piz Chavalatsch  - description, panorama

Ortler Alps
Mountains of the Alps
Mountains of Graubünden
International mountains of Europe
Italy–Switzerland border
Mountains of Switzerland
Two-thousanders of Switzerland
Val Müstair